Country Life in America was an American shelter magazine, first published in November 1901 as an illustrated monthly by Doubleday, Page & Company. Henry H. Saylor was the initial managing editor, and Robert M. McBride started his career at this publication.

While its initial readership target was the rural dweller, it soon changed its focus to people looking for ideas on country living.  In 1917, the name changed to The New Country Life, then Country Life, and the magazine ended production in 1942.

References

External links
 Country Life in America at the HathiTrust
 The New Country Life (1917-1918) at the HathiTrust
 Country Life in the War (1918) at the HathiTrust
 Country Life (1919-1937) at the HathiTrust
 Country Life in America, various editions.  From Google Books.

Lifestyle magazines published in the United States
Monthly magazines published in the United States
Defunct magazines published in the United States
Doubleday, Page & Company books
Magazines established in 1901
Magazines disestablished in 1942
Magazines published in New York City